Crawford School may refer to:
Crawford School of Public Policy
 Crawford School, of Excelsior Township School District 1, in Excelsior Township, Michigan
 Crawford-Rodriguez Elementary School - Jackson, New Jersey - Jackson School District
 Crawford Elementary School - Houston, Texas - List of Houston Independent School District elementary schools

See also
 Crawford County Schools